Tapioca chips are a snack food made from thin wafers of deep fried cassava root. It is commonly found in South India and Sri Lanka, as well as in Indonesia where it is known as kripik singkong (cassava chips). 

It is also a bulk commodity product that is produced and traded, and in this form is used to create products such as alcohol, animal feed, biofuel and starch.

Overview
The dish is prepared using raw cassava tubers, whereby the inner rind and outer skin are removed. The chips are then fried or deep fried in coconut oil, salted and often spiced with red chili powder.

Tapioca chips have a longer shelf life compared to raw cassava tubers. The snack is sometimes purveyed and consumed as a street food.

Some companies mass-produce and purvey prepared tapioca chips that are packaged in bags.

Variations

India and Sri Lanka

The snack is widely available in Tamil Nadu, Kerala, Karnataka, and Sri Lanka. High in carbohydrates, it is a crunchy and flavorful snack food, and the chips are crunchier compared to banana chips and potato chips. Common variants include the non-spicy and spicy (red chili pepper powder and other spices added).

Indonesia

Thinly sliced cassava is deep fried to be made as kripik singkong crackers (cassava chips or tapioca chips). Next to potato chips, cassava chips is a popular snack in Indonesia, and are often spiced with various flavors. Some are mass-produced and purveyed under various brand names in stores and supermarkets.

A variant of hot and spicy kripik singkong coated with sugar and chili pepper is known as kripik balado or keripik sanjay, a specialty of Bukittinggi city in West Sumatra.

Commercial tapioca chips
Tapioca chips and pellets are also produced, sold and traded in bulk as a commodity, and are used to make starch, alcohol and biofuel. The product is also used as animal feed in Kerala and Madras, India, and for this purpose, processing typically involves only the removal of the outer skin of the tubers. Commercial varieties typically consist of the sliced and dried cassava tuber, and are not fried in oil.

See also

 Banana chips
 Cassava-based dishes
 List of deep fried foods
 List of street foods
 Tapioca
 Vegetable chips

References

Further reading

External links
 
 

Deep fried foods
Indian snack foods
Indonesian snack foods
Kerala cuisine
Sri Lankan snack food
Cassava dishes